Pauline Polaire (stage name of Giulietta Gozzi) was an Italian actress.

Giuletta Gozzi was born in Ravenna, Italy, on 30 June 1904. She was the niece of the Italian actress Hesperia, née Olga Mambelli. She died in Rome on 11 February 1986.

The similarity of her name with that of French actress Polaire has given rise to some confusion in their filmographies in sites specialized in cinema.

Filmography 

 1918 : Leggerezza e castigo, by Gero Zambuto
 1920 : L'istinto, by Baldassarre Negroni
 1920 : Germoglio, by Torello Rolli
 1920 : La farina del diavolo, by Luigi Romano Borgnetto
 1920 : L'altro pericolo, by Baldassarre Negroni
 1921 : Il figlio di Madame Sans Gêne, by Baldassarre Negroni
 1921 : Un punto nero, by Augusto Genina
 1922 : La duchessa Mistero, by Baldassarre Negroni
 1922 : Il controllore dei vagoni letto, by Mario Almirante
 1923 : L'ora terribile, by Baldassarre Negroni
 1923 : La locanda delle ombre, by Baldassarre Negroni and Ivo Illuminati
 1923 : Un viaggio nell'impossibile, by Luciano Doria and Nunzio Malasomma
 1923 : Il capolavoro di Saetta, by Eugenio Perego
 1923 : Saetta contro la ghigliottina, by Émile Vardannes
 1923 : Le vie del mare, by Torello Rolli
 1924 : Treno di piacere, by Luciano Doria
 1924 : La taverna verde, by Luciano Doria
 1924 : Saetta impara a vivere, by Guido Brignone
 1924 : Maciste e il nipote d'America, by Eleuterio Rodolfi
 1924 : Caporal Saetta, by Eugenio Perego
 1925 : Maciste all'inferno by Guido Brignone : Graziella

References 

1904 births
1986 deaths
Italian film actresses
People from Ravenna
Actresses from Rome